Maurice Magre (Occitan: Maurici Magre; 2 March 1877 - 11 December 1941) was a French writer, poet, and playwright.

He was an ardent defender of Occitan, and did much to publicize the martyrdom of the Cathars in the 13th century. For his historical novels on Catharism, Magre is particularly in line with the historian Napoléon Peyrat, in the sense that the author often prefers legends and the romantic epic to historical truth.

Novels 
 L'Appel de la bête (1920)
 Les Colombes poignardées (1917)
 La Tendre Camarade (1918)
 Priscilla d'Alexandrie (1925)
 La Vie amoureuse de Messaline (1925)
 La Vie des Courtisanes (1925) 
 La Luxure de Grenade (1926)
 Le Mystère du Tigre (1927)
 Lucifer (1929)
 La Nuit de haschich et d'opium (1929)
 La Lumière de la Chine. Le Roman de Confucius (1927)
 Le Sang de Toulouse. Histoire albigeoise du XIIème siècle (1931)
 Le Trésor des Albigeois (1938)
 Un Français à la cour de l'empereur Akbar. Jean de Fodoas (1939)
 Histoire merveilleuse de Claire d'Amour.
 L'Art de séduire les femmes (1929)
 Le Poison de Goa (1928)

Poetry 
 La Chanson des hommes (1898)
 Le Poème de la jeunesse (1901)
 Les Lèvres et le secret (1905-1906) 
 Les Belles de Nuit (1913)
 La Montée aux enfers. Poésies (1918)
 La Porte du mystère (1924)
 Le Parc des Rossignols (1940)

References

External links
 Maurice Magre; Wikisource

French novelists
French poets
French dramatists and playwrights
1877 births
1941 deaths